Maria Gażycz, née Maria Nowina-Chrzanowska (20 March 1860, Vishera, Kursk Governorate – 13 September 1935, Grodno) was a Belarusian-born Polish figure painter, art restorer, and nun in the order of the Sisters of the Holy Family of Nazareth.

Biography
Her father was an engineer; involved in the building of railways and bridges in Kursk. Her Swedish mother, Elzbieta, was a member of the aristocratic Nobel family. According to her mother's wishes, she was raised in the strict Orthodox tradition. Their winters were generally spent in Warsaw.

She and her three siblings were educated at home. From 1874 to 1878, she studied in Warsaw with Wojciech Gerson. In 1878, she had her first exhibition at the Zachęta and married Konstantin Gażycz (1848-1900), who owned an estate in the Grodno Region. They had a son who died in infancy.

Later, she studied in Munich and, from 1891 to 1895, attended the Académie Julian in Paris, where she worked with William-Adolphe Bouguereau, Tony Robert-Fleury and Jules Joseph Lefebvre.

When she was widowed, she went to live with her sister, Janina, in Kraków. The following year she converted to Catholicism and, in 1906, entered the convent of the Sisters of Nazareth in Rome. She took her first vows in 1908, and her perpetual vows in 1912. After that, she signed her paintings as "Sister Paula of Nazareth".

Until 1919, she served at the Sisters' convent dedicated to the Annunciation in Grodno, followed by service in Lublin. From 1923 to 1928, she was Mistress of novices in Albano and was Superior of the convent there until 1932. As her health began to fail, she retired to Grodno, where she died.

Selected paintings

References

Further reading
 Natalya Malinovskaya-Frank, "Забытая мастачка святла: жыццёвы і творчы шлях Марыі Гажыч" (Forgotten Artist of Light; the life and work of Maria Gażycz) in Роднае слова (Mother Tongue) 2009, #3 pgs.97-99.

External links 

 "Siostry Pawły z Nazaretu życie niezwykłe i obrazy w kolekcji Muzeum Polskiego w Ameryce" (Sister Paula of Nazareth: Life and Extraordinary Paintings in the Collection of the Polish Museum of America) by Julita Siegel, @ Dziennik Związkowy

1860 births
1935 deaths
19th-century Polish painters
20th-century Polish painters
Polish women painters
Belarusian painters
Religious artists
Belarusian women painters
People from Kursk Governorate
20th-century Polish Roman Catholic nuns
Nobel family
20th-century Polish women artists
19th-century Polish women artists